Andrew Leslie, 5th Earl of Rothes (before 1541–1611) was a Scottish nobleman.

Early life
He was the son of George Leslie, 4th Earl of Rothes, and his third wife Agnes Somerville, daughter of Sir John Somerville of Cambusnethan and Elizabeth Carmichael.

He succeeded his father as 5th Earl in 1558, as his elder half-brothers Norman Leslie and William Leslie had forfeited their rights by having been implicated in the murder of Cardinal Beaton in 1546.

Career
Leslie took an active part with the Lords of the Congregation, first against the queen-mother, Mary of Guise, when she was regent of Scotland, and afterwards against Mary, Queen of Scots in opposing her marriage with Lord Darnley, and in being part of the plot to murder David Rizzio. He was, however, one of the peers who acquitted Bothwell of Darnley's murder, and went over to the side of the queen. He fought for her at the Battle of Langside, and continued to occupy a position of some prominence in Scottish affairs until his death in 1611.

Personal life
In 1547, Leslie married Grizel Hamilton, daughter of Sir James Hamilton of Finnart and wife Margaret Livingston of Easter Wemyss. A dispensation was required for the marriage, which cost Regent Arran £20 and he paid a dowry of £1,333 Scots. Their children included:

 James Leslie, Master of Rothes, who married Hon. Margaret Lindsay, only daughter of Patrick Lindsay, 6th Lord Lindsay.  
 Patrick Leslie (d. 1608), who was the 1st Lord Lindores; he married married Jean Stewart, a daughter of Robert Stewart, 1st Earl of Orkney (a natural son of King James V of Scotland by Euphemia Elphinstone).
 Eupheme Leslie, who married James Lindsay, 7th Lord Lindsay, the only son of the 6th Lord Lindsay, in 1573.

As his eldest son and heir apparent died before him, he was succeeded in his titles by James' son, and his grandson, John Leslie.

One of his descendants is American actor-director Olivia Wilde.

References

External links
Clan Leslie Trust

16th-century births
1611 deaths
5